Arch Lake is a lake in Carbon County, Montana, in the United States.

Arch Lake took its name from the granite arch that sits on the south ridge. It is remote from all roads, but can be reached on foot. Much of the route to it is rugged and part of the way has no trail.

See also
List of lakes in Montana

References

Lakes of Montana
Lakes of Carbon County, Montana